The 1963 2. divisjon was the first Norwegian national second-tier football league season.

The league was contested by 16 teams, divided into two groups; A and B. The winners of group A and B were promoted to the 1964 1. divisjon. The two lowest placed teams in both groups were relegated to the 3. divisjon.

Overview

Summary
Sandefjord BK won group A with 24 points. Raufoss won group B with 21 points. Both teams were promoted to the 1964 1. divisjon.

Tables

Group A

Group B

References

Norwegian First Division seasons
1963 in Norwegian football
Norway
Norway